Vennesla Station is a railway station located in the village of Vennesla in the municipality of Vennesla in Agder county, Norway.  Located along the Sørlandet Line, the station is served by express trains to Oslo and Kristiansand.  The trains are operated by Go-Ahead Norge.

History
The station was opened in 1895 as part of the Setesdal Line. In 1935 it became part of Sørlandet Line when it was extended from Neslandsvatn Station to Kristiansand Station. The Setesdal Line has since closed and has been converted to a heritage railway.

External links 

 Entry at Jernbaneverket 

Railway stations in Agder
Railway stations on the Sørlandet Line
Railway stations opened in 1895
Vennesla
1895 establishments in Norway